The word dabar means "word", "talk" or "thing" in Hebrew. Dabar occurs in various contexts in the Hebrew Bible. 

The Septuagint, the oldest translation of the Hebrew Bible into Greek, uses the terms rhema and logos as equivalents and uses both for dabar.

In Christianity, the Old Testament concept of "word event" represented by dabar carries over to the New Testament where revelation can be seen as events explained by words.
See Craig M. Nelson, Teleology and Structural Directedness, Heythrop Journal 2019  page79-94. 

Modern languages adopt the term "Word", although it is often used transliterated but untranslated in theological discourse.

References

Hebrew words and phrases
Hebrew words and phrases in the Hebrew Bible